The New York State Open is the New York state open golf tournament, open to both amateur and professional golfers. It is organized by the Metropolitan chapter of the Professional Golfers' Association of America. It has been played annually since 1978 at a variety of courses around the state. It is a 54-hole stroke-play event, with a cut after 36 holes. Tournaments using the same name were played in 1921 and from 1928 to 1930 and are regarded as PGA Tour events.

Earlier events by the same name were played in 1920 and 1921 and again from 1928 to 1930.

Winners 

Source:

See also 

 New York State Open (1920s event)
 Bellevue Country Club Open

References

External links
PGA of America – Metropolitan section

Former PGA Tour events
Golf in New York (state)
PGA of America sectional tournaments
State Open golf tournaments
Recurring sporting events established in 1921
1921 establishments in New York (state)